HK Taš is an ice hockey club in Belgrade, Serbia. HK Taš was formed in 1995. The club built from bottom up, starting out with junior teams only. It is expected that the team will have an adult team in the future, which will play in the Serbian Hockey League.

External links 
Official site 

Sport in Belgrade
Ice hockey teams in Serbia
Serbian Hockey League teams
Palilula, Belgrade